Walter Furlong (1 September 1893 – 11 December 1973) was an Irish politician from Cork city, most successful as a member of Fianna Fáil. 

According to his death notice Furlong was in "G" Company, 1st Battalion, 1st Cork Brigade, Irish Republican Army, and had been interned on Bere Island, released on the signing of the 1921 truce.

He ran for Fianna Fáil in Cork Borough in the general elections of 1943, 1944, 1948, and 1951, being elected only in 1944, to the 12th Dáil, and losing his seat to Jack Lynch in 1948.

Furlong was a member of Cork City Council in the 1930s, and was fined 20 shillings in 1935 for harassing the city manager in relation to a constituent's claim for a corporation house. He was re-elected to the council for Fianna Fáil in 1945 and served as Lord Mayor of Cork in 1951. He lost his council seat at the 1960 local election, running for the Cork Civic Party.

References

1893 births
1973 deaths
Fianna Fáil TDs
Members of the 12th Dáil
Lord Mayors of Cork
Cork Civic Party politicians
Irish Republican Army (1919–1922) members